Linda Ryan is a Cypriot international lawn bowler who has won 19 titles at the Cypriot National Championships.

Bowls career
In 2009 she won a medal at the European Bowls Championships. She won a pairs silver medal with Fran Davis, at the 2015 Atlantic Bowls Championships held in her home country

Ryan was selected as part of the two woman team by Cyprus for the 2016 World Outdoor Bowls Championship, which was held in Avonhead, Christchurch, New Zealand. In 2017, she won her second European Championships medal.

References

Living people
Cypriot bowls players
Year of birth missing (living people)